Roku is a brand of hardware digital media players manufactured by American company Roku, Inc. They offer access to streaming media content from online services.

The first Roku model, developed in collaboration with Netflix, was introduced in May 2008. Roku devices are considered to have popularized the concept of low-cost, small-form-factor set-top boxes for over-the-top media consumption. Roku has also licensed its platform as middleware for smart TVs.

As of September 2022, Roku has 65.4 million active accounts.

History
Roku was founded by Anthony Wood in 2002, who had previously founded ReplayTV, a DVR company that competed with TiVo. After ReplayTV's failure, Wood worked for a while at Netflix. In 2007, Wood's company began working with Netflix on Project:Griffin, a set-top box to allow Netflix users to stream Netflix content to their TVs. Only a few weeks before the project's launch, Netflix's founder Reed Hastings decided it would hamper license arrangements with third parties, potentially keeping Netflix off other similar platforms, and killed the project. Fast Company magazine cited the decision to kill the project as "one of Netflix's riskiest moves".

Netflix decided instead to spin off the company, and Roku released their first set-top box in 2008. In 2010 they began offering models with various capabilities, which eventually became their standard business model. In 2014, Roku partnered with smart TV manufacturers to produce TVs with built-in Roku functionality. In 2015, Roku won the inaugural Emmy for Television Enhancement Devices.

In 2019, Roku acquired dataxu, an advertising technology company for $150 million.

Roku streaming players

First generation 

The first Roku model, the Roku DVP N1000, was unveiled on May 20, 2008. It was developed in partnership with Netflix to serve as a standalone set-top box for its recently introduced "Watch Instantly" service. The goal was to produce a device with a small footprint that could be sold at low cost compared to larger digital video recorders and video game consoles. It features an NXP PNX8935 video decoder supporting both standard and high definition formats up to 720p; HDMI output; and automatic software updates, including the addition of new channels for other video services.

Roku launched two new models in October 2009: the Roku SD (a simplified version of the DVP, with only analog AV outputs); and the Roku HD-XR, an updated version with 802.11n Wi-Fi and a USB port for future functionality. The Roku DVP was retroactively renamed the Roku HD. By then, Roku had added support for other services. The next month, they introduced the Channel Store, where users could download third-party apps for other content services (including the possibility of private services for specific uses).

Netflix support was initially dependent on a PC, requiring users to add content to their "Instant Queue" from the service's web interface before it could be accessed via the Roku. In May 2010, the channel was updated to allow users to search the Netflix library directly from the device.

In August 2010, Roku announced plans to add 1080p video support to the HD-XR. The next month, they released an updated lineup with thinner form factors: a new HD; the XD, with 1080p support; and the XDS, with optical audio, dual-band Wi-Fi, and a USB port. The XD and XDS also included an updated remote.

Support for the first-generation Roku models ended in September 2015.

Second generation 

In July 2011, Roku unveiled its second generation of players, branded as Roku 2 HD, XD, and XS. All three models include 802.11n, and also add microSD slots and Bluetooth. The XD and XS support 1080p, and only the XS model includes an Ethernet connector and USB port. They also support the "Roku Game Remote"—a Bluetooth remote with motion controller support for games, which was bundled with the XS and sold separately for other models. The Roku LT was unveiled in October, as an entry-level model with no Bluetooth or microSD support.

In January 2012, Roku unveiled the Streaming Stick - a new model condensed into a dongle form factor using Mobile High-Definition Link (MHL). Later in October, Roku introduced a new search feature to the second-generation models, aggregating content from services usable on the device.

Third generation 
Roku unveiled its third-generation models in March 2013, the Roku 3 and Roku 2. The Roku 3 contains an upgraded CPU over the 2 XS, and a Wi-Fi Direct remote with an integrated headphone jack. The Roku 2 features only the faster CPU.

Fourth generation 
In October 2015, Roku introduced the Roku 4; the device contains upgraded hardware with support for 4K resolution video, as well as 802.11ac wireless.

Fifth generation 
In September 2016, Roku revamped their entire streaming player line-up with five new models (low end Roku Express, Roku Express+, high end Roku Premiere, Roku Premiere+, and top-of-the-line Roku Ultra), while the Streaming Stick (3600) was held over from the previous generation (having been released the previous April) as a sixth option. The Roku Premiere+ and Roku Ultra support HDR video using HDR10.

Sixth generation 
In October 2017, Roku introduced its sixth generation of products. The Premiere and Premiere+ models were discontinued, the Streaming Stick+ (with an enhanced Wi-Fi antenna device) was introduced, as well as new processors for the Roku Streaming Stick, Roku Express, and Roku Express+.

Seventh generation 
In September 2018, Roku introduced the seventh generation of products. Carrying over from the 2017 sixth-generation without any changes were the Express (3900), Express+ (3910), Streaming Stick (3800), and Streaming Stick+ (3810). The Ultra is the same hardware device from 2017, but it comes with JBL premium headphones and is repackaged with the new model number 4661. Roku has resurrected the Premiere and Premiere+ names, but these two new models bear little resemblance to the 2016 fifth-generation Premiere (4620) and Premiere+ (4630) models. The new Premiere (3920) and Premiere+ (3921) are essentially based on the Express (3900) model with 4K support added, it also includes Roku Streaming Stick+ Headphone Edition (3811) for improving Wifi signal strength and private listening.

Eighth generation 
In September 2019, Roku introduced the eighth generation of products.

The same year, Netflix announced that it would stop supporting older generations of Roku, including the Roku HD, HD-XR, SD, XD, and XDS, as well as the NetGear-branded XD and XDS beginning on December 1, 2019. Roku had warned in 2015 that it would stop updating players made in May 2011 or earlier, and these vintage boxes were among them.

Ninth generation 
On September 28, 2020, Roku introduced the ninth generation of products. An updated Roku Ultra was released along with the addition of the Roku Streambar, a 2-in-1 Roku and Soundbar device. The microSD slot was removed from the new Ultra 4800, making it the first top-tier Roku device since the first generation to lack this feature. On April 14, 2021, Roku announced the Roku Express 4K+, replacing the 8th generation Roku Express devices, the Voice Remote Pro as an optional upgrade for existing Roku players, and Roku OS 10 for all modern Roku devices.

Tenth generation 
On September 20, 2021, Roku introduced the tenth generation of products. The Roku Streaming Stick 4K was announced along with the Roku Streaming Stick 4K+ which includes an upgraded rechargeable Roku Voice Remote Pro with lost remote finder. Roku announced an updated Roku Ultra LT with a faster processor, stronger Wi-Fi and Dolby Vision as well as Bluetooth audio streaming and built-in ethernet support. Roku also announced Roku OS 10.5 with several new and improved features.

On November 15, 2021, Roku announced a budget model Roku LE (3930S3) to be sold at Walmart, while supplies last. It lacks 4K and HDR10 support, making its features similar to those of the 2019 Roku Express (3930). It has the same form factor as the 2019 Roku Express, except the plastic shell is white rather than black.

Feature comparison

Roku TV 

Roku announced its first branded smart TV and it was released in late 2014. These TVs are manufactured by companies like TCL, Westinghouse and Hisense, and use the Roku user interface as the "brain" of the TV. Roku TVs are updated just like the streaming devices. More recent models also integrate a set of features for use with over-the-air TV signals, including a program guide that provides information for shows and movies available on local antenna broadcast TV, as well as where that content is available to stream, and the ability to pause live TV (although the feature requires a USB hard drive with at least 16GB storage).

On November 14, 2019, Walmart and Roku announced that they would be selling Roku TVs under the Onn brand exclusively at Walmart stores, starting November 29.

In January 2020, Roku created a badge to certify devices as working with a Roku TV model. The first certified brands were TCL North America, Sound United, Polk Audio, Marantz, Definitive Technology, and Classé.

In January 2021, a Roku executive said one out of three smart TVs sold in the United States and Canada came with Roku's operating system built-in.

In May 2020, Roku announced a 55-inch outdoor Element Roku TV. The television offers minimal reflection, an anti-glare display, 4K streaming, and can be used in bright outdoor environments.

Software 
The Roku box runs a custom Linux distribution called Roku OS. Updates to the software include bug fixes, security updates, feature additions, and many new interface revisions. Roku pushes OS updates to supported devices in a staggered release. OS updates are rolled out to a percentage group of candidate devices to ensure the build is stable before being made available en masse.

Content and programming 
Roku provides video services from a number of Internet-based video on demand providers.

Roku channels 
Content on Roku devices is provided by Roku partners and is identified using the term channel. Users can add or remove different channels using the Roku Channel Store or the search feature. Roku's website does not specify which channels are free to its users.

Service creation for Roku Player 
The Roku is an open-platform device with a freely available software development kit that enables anyone to create new channels. The channels are written in a Roku-specific language called BrightScript, a scripting language the company describes as 'unique', but "similar to Visual Basic" and "similar to JavaScript".

Developers who wish to test their channels before a general release, or who wish to limit viewership, can create "private" channels that require a code be entered by the user in the account page of the Roku website. These private channels, which are not part of the official Roku Channel Store, are neither reviewed or certified by Roku.

There is an NDK (Native Developer Kit) available, though it has added restrictions.

The Roku Channel

Roku launched its own streaming channel on its devices in October 2017. It is ad-supported, but free. Its licensed content includes movies and TV shows from studios such as Lionsgate, MGM, Paramount, Sony Pictures Entertainment, Warner Bros., Disney, and Universal as well as Roku channel content publishers American Classics, FilmRise, Nosey, OVGuide, Popcornflix, Vidmark, and YuYu. It is implementing an ad revenue sharing model with content providers. On August 8, 2018, the Roku Channel became available on the web as well. Roku also added the "Featured Free" section as the top section of its main menu from which users can get access to direct streaming of shows and movies from its partners.

In January 2019, premium subscription options from select content providers were added to the Roku Channel.  Originally only available in the U.S., it launched in the UK on April 7, 2020, with a different selection of movies and TV shows, and without premium subscription add-ons.

On January 8, 2021, Roku announced that it had acquired the original content library of the defunct mobile video service Quibi for an undisclosed amount, reported to be around $100 million. The content is being rebranded as Roku Originals.

Controversies

Non-certified channels 
The Daily Beast alleged that non-certified channels on Roku eased access to materials promoting conspiracy theories and terrorism content.

In June 2017, a Mexico City court banned the sale of Roku products in Mexico, following claims by Televisa (via its Izzi cable subsidiary) that the devices were being used for subscription-based streaming services that illegally stream television content without permission from copyright holders. The devices used Roku's private channels feature to install the services, which were all against the terms of service Roku applies for official channels available in its store. Roku defended itself against the allegations as such, stating that these channels were not officially certified and that the company takes active measures to stop illegal streaming services. The 11th Collegiate Court in Mexico City overturned the decision in October 2018, with Roku returning to the Mexican market soon after; Televisa's streaming service Blim TV would also launch on the platform.

In August 2017 Roku began to display a prominent disclaimer when non-certified channels are added, warning that channels enabling piracy may be removed "without prior notice". In mid-May 2018, a software glitch caused some users to see copyright takedown notices on legitimate services such as Netflix and YouTube. Roku acknowledged and patched the glitch.

In March 2022, the private channel system was deprecated due to abuse and replaced with a more limited and strict beta channels platform which only allows twenty users to test a channel for up to four months.

Carriage disputes 

Pay television-styled carriage disputes emerged on the Roku platform in 2020, as the company requires providers to agree to revenue sharing for subscription services that are billed through the platform, and to hold 30% of advertising inventory. On September 18 of that same year, Roku announced that NBCUniversal TV Everywhere services would be removed from its devices "as early as this weekend", due to its refusal to carry the company's streaming service Peacock (which had been unavailable on Roku since its launch in July 2020) under terms it deemed "unreasonable". It reached an agreement with NBCUniversal later that day, which allowed Peacock to become available on Roku. HBO Max, which launched in May 2020, was unavailable on Roku until December 2020 due to similar disputes over revenue sharing, particularly in regards to an upcoming ad-supported tier. On December 17, 2020, HBO Max began streaming on Roku, after WarnerMedia and Roku reached a deal the previous day (and also after media speculation that WarnerMedia moving Wonder Woman 1984 and Warner Bros' 2021 theatrical slate to a hybrid theatrical/HBO Max release model were an attempt to get Roku to agree to their terms).

Another dispute, starting mid-December 2020, caused Spectrum customers to be unable to download the Spectrum TV streaming app to their Roku devices; existing customers could retain the app, but would lose it upon deletion, even to fix software bugs. This dispute was resolved on August 17, 2021.

On April 30, 2021, Roku removed the over-the-top television service YouTube TV from its Channels Store, preventing it from being downloaded. The company accused operator Google LLC of making demands regarding its YouTube app that it considered "predatory, anti-competitive and discriminatory", including enhanced access to customer data, giving YouTube greater prominence in Roku's search interface, and requiring that Roku implement specific hardware standards that could increase the cost of its devices.  Roku accused Google of "leveraging its YouTube monopoly to force an independent company into an agreement that is both bad for consumers and bad for fair competition."

Google claimed that Roku had "terminated our deal in bad faith amidst our negotiation", stating that it wanted to renew the "existing reasonable terms" under which Roku offered YouTube TV. Google denied Roku's claims regarding customer data and prominence of the YouTube app, and stated that its carriage of a YouTube app was under a separate agreement, and unnecessarily brought into negotiations. As a partial workaround, YouTube began to deploy an update to its main app on Roku and other platforms, which integrates the YouTube TV service. On December 8, 2021 (a day before the agreement for the main YouTube app expired), Roku and Google announced that they have settled their dispute and reached a multi-year agreement to keep the YouTube app on Roku and to restore the YouTube TV app on Roku.

See also 
 Comparison of digital media players
 SoundBridge, another Roku product
 Smart TV

Notes

References

External links 
 

Telecommunications-related introductions in 2008
Digital media players
Internet radio
Streaming television
Linux-based devices
Online advertising services and affiliate networks
Technological comparisons